Adam Lloyd may refer to:

 Murders of Adam Lloyd and Vanessa Arscott
Adam Lloyd (actor) from Big Ideas (film)
Adam Lloyd (ice hockey), player on the Oshawa Generals
Adam Lloyd (racing driver) in the 2009 Commodore Cup National Series
 British crime writer Adam Lloyd, who co-authored Gone Fishing: The Unsolved Crimes of Angus Sinclair with Chris Clark